Parent Lake is an enlargement of the Bell River, flowing north-west into the Matagami Lake.

Recreational tourism activities, including boating, are developed in this sector. From the Senneterre railway bridge, it is possible to sail north on the  via the "Chenal de l'Épinette" which joins Parent Lake, up to at the mouth of the Robin River.

The Parent Lake watershed is serviced on the west side by route 113, which connects Senneterre and Lebel-sur-Quévillon.

Geography 
This large, irregularly-shaped lake is fed by numerous streams, including the Robin and Delestres rivers to the northeast, and Mégiscane River, to the southeast.

The main islands are Wigwam Island (the largest in area), Bannerman Island and Prospect Island. Among the other small islands identified: White Island, Round Island and Real Island. The "Passe de l’Esturgeon” (English: Sturgeon Pass) is located between the east shore of the lake and Wigwam Island. The "Passe de l’Épinette” (English: Spruce Pass), which is located between the west bank of the Bell River and the northward peninsula, connects the Senneterre Lake upstream.

Fishing 

Fishing for walleye, pike and yellow perch is excellent. There is one public fishing lodge, The lodge at Parent Lake, otherwise known as Domaine Du Lac Parent, that sits along route 113. They have cabins that can accompany between 2-8 guests.

Toponymy 
Replacing the Algonquin name of Chabogama or Shabogama, the channel lake in 1921, this hydronym pays tribute to Simon-Napoléon Parent (1855–1920), former mayor of the city of Québec and former premier of province of Quebec, for his entire public career.

Notes and references

See also 
Nottaway River, a watercourse
Rupert Bay
James Bay
List of lakes of Canada

Lakes of Abitibi-Témiscamingue
Jamésie
Nottaway River drainage basin
La Vallée-de-l’Or